The W.A.C. Bennett ministry was the combined Cabinet (formally the Executive Council of British Columbia) that governed British Columbia from August 1, 1952, to September 15, 1972. It was led by W.A.C. Bennett, the 25th premier of British Columbia, and consisted of members of the Social Credit Party.

The W.A.C. Bennett ministry was established after the 1952 British Columbia general election when premier Boss Johnson was defeated in the general election and Dave Barrett was elected as his successor. The cabinet governed through the 29th Parliament of British Columbia, until the Social Credit Party was defeated in the 1972 British Columbia general election. It was succeeded by the Barrett ministry.
This ministry is also the cabinet with the longest duration of governance in the province's history.

List of ministers

References

Sources 

Politics of British Columbia
Executive Council of British Columbia
1952 establishments in British Columbia
Cabinets established in 1952
1972 disestablishments in British Columbia
Cabinets disestablished in 1972